Fifth Album is the fourth studio album (her 5th overall release) by American singer and songwriter Judy Collins, released by Elektra Records in 1965. It peaked at No. 69 on the Billboard Pop Albums chart''.

The album featured a collection of traditional ballads and singer-songwriter material from Bob Dylan, Richard Fariña, Phil Ochs and Malvina Reynolds. A number of the songs were topical in nature, particularly Ochs' "In the Heat of the Summer" (which chronicled the Harlem riot of 1964), and Reynolds' "It Isn't Nice".

Track listing
Side one
 "Pack Up Your Sorrows" (Richard Fariña, Pauline Marden) – 3:10
 "The Coming of the Roads" (Billy Edd Wheeler) – 3:31
 "So Early, Early in the Spring" (Traditional) – 3:04
 "Tomorrow is a Long Time" (Bob Dylan) – 4:04
 "Daddy You've Been on My Mind" (Dylan) – 2:52
 "Thirsty Boots" (Eric Andersen) – 4:57

Side two
 "Mr. Tambourine Man" (Dylan) – 5:20
 "Lord Gregory" (Traditional) – 3:28
 "In the Heat of the Summer" (Phil Ochs) – 3:21
 "Early Morning Rain" (Gordon Lightfoot) – 3:10
 "Carry It On" (Gil Turner) – 2:44
 "It Isn't Nice" (Malvina Reynolds, Barbara Dane) – 2:58
"It Isn't Nice" recorded in concert at the Town Hall, New York, March 21, 1964.

Personnel
Judy Collins – guitar, keyboards, vocals

Additional musicians
Richard Fariña – dulcimer (tracks 1, 11)
Eric Weissberg – second guitar (tracks 1, 3, 6, 10, 12), vocal (track 12)
Bill Takas – double bass (tracks 1, 6)
Bill Lee – double bass (tracks 4–5, 7, 10)
Danny Kalb – second guitar (track 5)
John Sebastian – harmonica (track 6)
Robert Sylvester – cello (track 8)
Jerry Dodgion – flute (track 12)
Chuck Israels – double bass (track 12)

Technical
Jac Holzman – production supervisor
Mark Abramson – recording director
Jim Frawley – cover photo
William S. Harvey – cover design
Richard Fariña – liner notes

References

1965 albums
Judy Collins albums
Albums produced by Mark Abramson
albums produced by Jac Holzman
Elektra Records albums